Leek Town Football Club is an English football club based in Leek, Staffordshire, playing in the . The team, nicknamed "The Blues", play their home games at Harrison Park.

The club was founded in 1946 and played in a variety of local leagues including the Staffordshire County League, Manchester League, Mid-Cheshire League and Cheshire County League, before becoming a founder member of the North West Counties League in 1982 and from there progressing to the Northern Premier League in 1987. In 1997 they were Northern Premier League champions and gained promotion to the Football Conference, the highest level of English non-league football, spending two seasons at that level before being relegated.

Leek Town reached the final of the FA Trophy in 1990, having progressed all the way from the first qualifying round, but lost in the final at Wembley Stadium 3–0 to Barrow.

History
Football was played in Leek from at least 1876, with an earlier side called simply Leek F.C. having been part of The Combination in the 1890s, but the current Leek Town club traces its lineage to the formation of a team called Leek Lowe Hamil in 1946 (although the club's official history does not mention it, some sources state that the club was initially known as Abbey Green Rovers before adopting the Lowe Hamil name).

The club began life playing in the local Leek and Moorlands League, playing on a field adjoining a pub, before joining the Staffordshire County League in 1947. In 1949–50 Lowe Hamil were champions of this league, becoming the first (and to date only) team to win the title without losing a single match (some sources state this title win occurred in 1950–51). In 1951 the team switched to the Manchester League, adopting the name Leek Town at the same time, and won the championship at the first attempt, after which the team relocated once more to the Mid-Cheshire League, where again they played for just one season. In 1954 the team joined the Birmingham & District League but resigned in the middle of the 1956–57 season due to financial difficulties, after which they had another brief spell in the Manchester League, which was also curtailed due to monetary problems, before eventually returning to the Staffordshire County League.

In 1968 a new committee was formed, under which the club emerged from the doldrums. Manager Paul Ogden took over in 1969 and led the club to two Staffordshire County League championships, followed in quick succession by two Manchester League titles. After the second Manchester League win, Leek joined the Cheshire County League, where they were league champions at the second attempt in the 1974–75 season, but after Ogden left in 1975 to take over as manager of Northwich Victoria a series of managers came and went in quick succession without being able to maintain this level of success.

In 1982 the Cheshire County League merged with the Lancashire Combination to form the new North West Counties League, where Leek spent five relatively unsuccessful seasons. During their spell in this league former England player Mike Pejic took over as manager, Leek's most high-profile appointment to date, but he had only a short reign before moving to Northwich Victoria. Following Kevin Lewis' brief reign Neil Baker took over in 1986 and was to lead the club to some of its greatest successes to date.

Leek were chosen to be among the founder members of the new Northern Premier League Division One in 1987 and in 1989–90 won the Division One title to gain promotion to the Premier Division, the highest level at which they had ever played. In the same season they progressed through eight rounds of the FA Trophy, including a quarter-final win over Darlington, that season's Conference champions, to reach the final at Wembley Stadium but were defeated 3–0 by Barrow.

In 1993–94 Leek finished second in the Northern Premier League Premier Division, which should have been sufficient for promotion to the Football Conference. However, they were refused promotion due to financial irregularities. To compound their problems, they were shifted from the Northern Premier League to the Southern League; the resulting travel costs proved a severe drain on the club. After one season the club was allowed to return to the Northern Premier League.

In 1996–97 Leek claimed the Northern Premier League title by ten points and were this time granted promotion to the Conference. In their first season at this level they narrowly managed to avoid relegation but could not repeat the feat the following year and were relegated back to the Northern Premier League Premier Division. In 2000–01 the Blues were relegated to Division One, but regained their place in the Premier Division when the league was restructured due to the formation of Conference North in 2004. The club achieved several mid-table finishes in the league but struggled off the pitch. On 21 June 2006 it was announced that the club was in such severe financial peril that it was facing a winding-up order, but on 11 June the following year it was confirmed that a new consortium had taken over the club and secured its future. In the 2007–08 season Leek finished in the bottom four, resulting in relegation to Division One South. Between the 2011–12 and 2014–15 seasons the club qualified for the play-offs for promotion back to the Premier Division three times, but missed out each time. In 2011–12 Leek lost in the final to Ilkeston. Two seasons later the team lost at the semi-final stage to Belper Town, and in 2015–16 Leek lost in the final to Sutton Coldfield Town.

Due to league re-organisations, since 2015 Leek have played in Division One South, Division One West, and Division One South East.  In the 2018–19 season Leek again made the play-offs and defeated Ramsbottom United in the semi-finals but lost in the final to Radcliffe.  Both the subsequent two seasons were abandoned due to the COVID-19 pandemic.

Colours and crest
Leek's home colours have traditionally been all blue, and their away colours all yellow, both colours which reflect the town's coat of arms, which is predominantly blue and gold. The club has also used a blue and white kit similar to that of Blackburn Rovers, and away kits in other colours such as red and black, or lime green.  The team's shirts were sponsored for a number of years by butter manufacturer Kerrygold, whose headquarters are in the town.

The club's crest features a garb and a Staffordshire knot, both of which are elements of the town's arms, as well as a caduceus, a symbol which appears on token coins issued in Leek in the 18th century.

Stadium and supporters

Harrison Park lies on the outskirts of Leek and has been the team's home since 1948, when the club purchased what was then called Hamil Park for £1,250. Changing rooms were constructed in the 1950s (previously the players had been obliged to change in a nearby pub), along with the first covered accommodation for spectators, and floodlights (which had previously belonged to the defunct Rugby Town) were erected in 1972, soon after which the stadium was renamed Harrison Park after former club chairman Geoff Harrison.  In 1998 the ground was flooded when a nearby reservoir overflowed and the river which runs alongside the ground burst its banks.

The ground has a capacity of 3,600 spectators, with 625 seats.  There is a clubhouse for the use of supporters as well as a club shop.  The highest attendance figure recorded at Harrison Park came when the club played near-neighbours Macclesfield Town in an FA Cup 2nd qualifying round match in the 1973–74 season in front of a crowd of 3,512.  When Leek played in the Conference National, the average home attendance was around 600.  Since the club dropped from that level, attendances have been more modest; in the 2018–19 season Leek's average attendance was 351.

Statistics and records
Leek's highest ever finish in the English football league system was a 19th-place finish in Conference National (level 5) in 1997–98, the first of two seasons the team played at that level. The Blues have only twice progressed beyond the qualifying rounds of the FA Cup, reaching the first round in 1993–94 and the second round in 1990–91, when they held Chester City to a draw at home but lost 4–0 in the replay.  Leek reached the final of the FA Trophy in 1989–90 but lost 3–0 to Barrow at Wembley Stadium.

Managers
Despite their relatively short history, over 30 men have managed The Blues. Paul Ogden has had six separate spells in charge.

Current staff
As of December 2021

Honours

Rivalries
Leek's main local rivals are Buxton, the two sides having been historic Northern Premier League rivals throughout the 1990s. Matlock Town and Kidsgrove Athletic are also considered local rivals to the Blues.

References

External links

Official website

Football clubs in Staffordshire
Northern Premier League clubs
Leek, Staffordshire
Association football clubs established in 1946
Southern Football League clubs
National League (English football) clubs
1946 establishments in England
North West Counties Football League clubs
Football clubs in England
Staffordshire County League
Cheshire County League clubs